The Bolívar Province is a Peruvian province located in the La Libertad Region. It is one of the twelve provinces that make up that region.

Boundaries
North Amazonas Region
East San Martín Region
South Pataz Province
West Sánchez Carrión Province, Cajamarca Region

Political Division

Bolívar
Bambamarca
Condormarca
Longotea
Uchumarca
Ucuncha

Population
The province has an approximate population of 19,000 inhabitants

Capital
The capital of this province is the city of Bolívar.

See also
Pirqa Pirqa

Provinces of the La Libertad Region